Monika Bytčánková (born 14 May 1998) is a Slovak footballer who plays as a defender for Women's First League club ŠK Slovan Bratislava and the Slovakia women's national team.

Club career
Bytčánková has played for Slovan Bratislava in Slovakia.

International career
Bytčánková made her senior debut for Slovakia on 14 June 2019 in a 1–0 friendly home win over Poland.

References

External links

1998 births
Living people
Slovak women's footballers
Women's association football defenders
ŠK Slovan Bratislava (women) players
Slovakia women's international footballers